30 Years to Life (also known as Nightworld: 30 Years to Life) is a 1998 American made-for-television science fiction film directed by Michael Tuchner and starring Robert Hays, Hugh O'Conor and Amy Robbins. It was created for UPN in 1998 for the Thursday Night at the Movies block, as part of the six film Nightworld anthology. It was the first film in the anthology to air on the block.
Filming took place in the summer of 1998 in the Grand Duchy of Luxembourg, primarily  Luxembourg City.

Plot summary
In a futuristic society where prison has been abolished, a 15-year-old is punished for a murder he didn't commit by being subjected to a process that ages him thirty years. As an older man he sets out to find the real killer.

Cast
Robert Hays....Vincent Dawson
Hugh O'Conor....Young Vincent 'Vinnie' Dawson
Amy Robbins....Darla
Mirabelle Kirkland....Gweneth
Christien Anholt....Derek
Gabrielle Lazure....Kate
Jana Sheldon....Noreen
Zoot Lynam....Kyle
Doug Haley....Ben
Geoffrey Bateman....Detective Sidney
Michael J. Shannon....Graham
Kenny Seymour....Manager
Larue Hall....Judge Slark
Liza Sadovy....Doctor
Jules Werner....Clerk
Robert L. Hall....Prosecutor
Radica Jovicic....Defense Attorney
Special Appearances by:
Vernon Dobtcheff....Sandor
Michael Byrne....Oliver Mather
Josie d'Arby....Lucy
Bill Dunn....School Teacher

Home Media

United States:
The film was released on DVD in several combo packs from Echo Bridge Home Entertainment in 2010.
It is available to watch On Demand through Amazon Prime Video from FilmRise.

Germany:
It was released on DVD as a single release and a combo pack in 2004.

Japan:
It was released on VHS in 2000.

See also
List of television films produced for UPN
List of science fiction films of the 1990s
List of drama films of the 1990s
List of Canadian films of 1998

References

External links
 

List of Alliance Atlantis films
1998 television films
1998 films
1998 science fiction films
American science fiction television films
Films set in the future
Films directed by Michael Tuchner
Alliance Films films
1990s American films